GSL class of personnel ferries are series of six service craft built by state owned Goa Shipyard Limited, Vasco for Indian Navy. They are general purpose utility auxiliary watercraft used for transportation of personnel in harbour. The vessels stationed at Mumbai harbour are planned to be succeeded by Manoram class ferry.

List of vessels

Specifications

Displacement: 175 Tonnes
Speed: 11 knots
Dimensions: 28.10 m * 7.62 m * 1.47 m
Power: 2 diesel engines
Propulsion: 2 propellers
Crew: 6 sailors
Capacity: 156 seated passengers

See also
Manoram class ferry
Shalimar class ferry

References

External links
GSL - Products

Auxiliary ships of the Indian Navy
Ships of the Indian Navy
Auxiliary ferry classes